Marie-Charlotte Garin (born 2 September 1995) is a French politician from EELV (NUPES). She became the Member of Parliament for Rhône's 3rd constituency in the 2022 French legislative election.

References

See also 

 List of deputies of the 16th National Assembly of France

Living people
1995 births
Members of Parliament for Rhône
21st-century French women politicians
21st-century French politicians
Deputies of the 16th National Assembly of the French Fifth Republic
Europe Ecology – The Greens politicians
Women members of the National Assembly (France)